Herman Harold Rolfes (born July 13, 1936) was a Saskatchewan educator and politician who has held provincial office, as a former member of the Saskatchewan  provincial legislature. He has won a number of significant recognized awards and honours over his lifetime career.

Life before politics
The son of Joseph Rolfes and Josephine Heckmann, he was educated at St. Peter's College, at the Saskatoon Teacher's College and at the University of Saskatchewan. He served as principal for a number of elementary schools and as director of guidance for Holy Cross High School in Saskatoon. In 1961, Rolfes married Myrna Josephine Hopfner.

Politics
Rolfes was a member of the Saskatchewan, Canada, branch of the Co-operative Commonwealth Federation (CCF), a social democratic political party, and its successor, the Saskatchewan New Democratic Party (NDP). He was elected Member of the Legislative Assembly in the Saskatoon Nutana South 1971 to 1975 term and served with Premier Allan Blakeney. Again he was elected for the Saskatoon Buena Vista electoral riding for the 1975 until 1978 when he was re-elected in the same riding again with Premier Allan Blakeney, NDP, and served until 1982. Under  Allan Blakeney, NDP  he was appointed Minister of Social Services, Minister of Continuing Education and finally as Minister of Health. 1982 when he was defeated, and  Grant Devine, PC became the elected Premier. Herman Rolfes ran and won again in Saskatoon South in 1986 and 1991. Herman Harold Rolfes was Speaker of the Legislative Assembly of Saskatchewan or the presiding officer of the Saskatchewan legislature from 1991 to 1996.

Rolfes was a member of the Board of Governors for the University of Saskatchewan 1997-2003. Prior to his political career, he was a teacher in the Saskatchewan Catholic School system, elementary school principal and high school counsellor. He has also been a former appointed Saskatchewan Minister of Social Services, Saskatchewan Minister of Continuing Education, and Saskatchewan Minister of Health.

References

External links
Government Relations | Office of Protocol and Honours
Government Relations | Office of Protocol and Honours
SASKATCHEWAN SPEAKERS OF THE LEGISLATIVE ASSEMBLY
Members of the Board of Governors :: University of Saskatchewan ...
UNIVERSITY OF SASKATCHEWAN BOARD OF GOVERNORS APPOINTED ...
MINISTRIES FIRST MINISTRY

Speakers of the Legislative Assembly of Saskatchewan
Saskatchewan New Democratic Party MLAs
1936 births
Living people
Members of the Executive Council of Saskatchewan
Politicians from Saskatoon